Madonna Pearl Staunton  (6 October 1938– 16 December 2019) was an artist and poet who lived in Brisbane. She is known for her works on Australian Modernism.

Background and career 
Madonna Staunton was born in Murwillumbah on 6 October 1938 and died in Brisbane in 2019. She was the only child of book trader Albert Errol Staunton (1905-1962), and artist and poet Madge Staunton nee Jones (1917-1985). In 1951 her family moved to Brisbane where Staunton received formal art training from her mother, as well as Roy Churcher, Bronwyn Yeates (Thomas), Nevil Matthews and Jon Molvig. 

Staunton is recognised for her contributions to Australian Modernism over five decades. Staunton's earlier work consisted of torn sections of Contemporary Art Society newsletter and magazines. Her art was informed by notably poetry, literature, music and Buddhism and Zen philosophy and culture Illness in 1974, forced Staunton to reconsider her method from large scale paintings to collage. In the 1980s, Staunton showed an interest in assemblage and sculpture, along with a return to painting.

Staunton is know for creating small format collages, using scrap materials and everyday items in her works such as tickets, matchboxes, piano keys, book bindings taken from urban waste and assembled in an abstract format. Her art is noted as having an intense meditative and introspective qualities, reflective of her cultural beliefs.

In the 1996 Australian Day Honours Staunton was awarded the Medal of the Order of Australia (OAM) for "service to the visual arts".

In 2012 Madonna Staunton was interviewed in a digital story and oral history for the State Library of Queensland's James C Sourris AM Collection. In the interview Staunton talks to Professor Robert Leslie Lingard about her art and life, the influences on her art including her childhood, fragile health, and poetry, the various artists and experiences that she has encountered and that which motivates and inspires her.

Staunton died on 16 December 2019. A memorial service was held at the University of Queensland Art Museum, Brisbane.

Individual exhibitions

Group exhibitions

References

External links 
 QAGOMA Blog post "Out of a clear blue sky"
 Madonna Staunton OAM digital story, educational interview and oral history. James C. Sourris artist interview series 2010-2015, State Library of Queensland, 4 April 2012, 6.30min, 26:27min and 54:51min version available to view online.
 Portrait of an artist: Madonna Staunton retrospective  James C Sourris AM Collection, State Library of Queensland, 6 Sep 2022. In this Portrait of an Artist event Josh Milani from Milani Gallery, Brisbane Poet and Artist Nathan Shepherdson, and Peta Rake, Curator at the University of Queensland Art Museum, discuss the career and legacy of the late artist, Madonna Staunton OAM.

1938 births
2019 deaths
20th-century Australian women artists
20th-century Australian artists
Recipients of the Medal of the Order of Australia
Artists from Brisbane